Peru High School, also known as "PHS", is a high school located in Peru, Indiana, United States, serving students in grades 9–12 for Peru Community Schools since 1972.  The former high school building, built in 1939 and now serving as headquarters of the Miami Nation of Indiana, is included in the Peru High School Historic District listed on the National Register of Historic Places since 2013.

Athletics
Peru High's school colors are old gold and black and their athletic nickname is the Bengal Tigers.

Peru High School won a state championship in boys tennis 1970-71.

The Peru High School Wrestling Program has won 6 Conferences, 14 Sectionals, and 6 Regionals in just the last 20 years.  Wrestling is a single class sport in Indiana.

The Peru High School Boys Basketball team has won 40 Sectional titles and 3 Regional titles dating back to 1927.

Peru High School's main rivals are the other two schools in Miami County: Maconaquah and North Miami.

Peru High School offers the following sports:

School media
The Peruvian is the school's bi-weekly paper with current news, editorials, special features, photos, and a complete sports section.

The Narcissus is the student yearbook that is published annually.

Notable alumni
G. David Thompson (1899-1965), investment banker, industrialist, and modern art collector.
Kyle Macy was the 22nd overall pick in the 1979 NBA Draft. He was selected by the Phoenix Suns. Macy went on to play one season each for the Chicago Bulls (1985-86) and the Indiana Pacers (1986-87) before retiring from the NBA.
John Francis O'Hara, Cardinal, Archbishop of Philadelphia, and President of the University of Notre Dame.
Frank Erhart Emmanuel Germann (1887–1974), physicist, physical chemist, and university professor. He was a founding member of the modern chemistry department of the University of Colorado.
Albert Fredrick Ottomar Germann (1886–1976), physical chemist, university professor, and chemical entrepreneur. He was a founder (1935) and President of Nutritional Research Associates, Inc., in South Whitley, Indiana.
B.J. Penn, served as Assistant Secretary of the Navy (Installations and Environment) from 2005-2009.

See also
 List of high schools in Indiana

References

External links
 Official website

Public high schools in Indiana
Schools in Miami County, Indiana